Miss Teenager World is the oldest international teen beauty pageant, founded in Guayaquil, Ecuador.

The pageant is only open to teenage girls and women who have never been married or given birth.

The current titleholder is Ilse Torres Granados of Mexico.

History
Miss Teenager World was launched in the year 1990 and continued in the coming year as well.

In 2016, the beauty contest chose to Miss Teenager Universal and was held for the first time in the history in Panamá.

Titleholders 
The following women have been crowned Miss Teenager World

1No pageant was held in 2020 due to the global restrictions on public events and international travel imposed by the Covid-19 pandemic.

Countries/Territory by winning number

Major beauty pageants
Miss Teenager World titleholders in the world's major beauty contests.

Crossovers
Titleholders who previously competed or will be competing at other international beauty pageants:

Miss Asia Pacific International
 2003: : Tracy Freundt (3rd. Runner Up)
Miss Turismo de las Américas
 2006: : Yalitza Alcívar (Winner)
Top Model of the World
 2008: : Paloma Almonte(Unplaced)

See also
 Miss Teen World

References

External links
 

Beauty pageants in Panama
Beauty pageants in Ecuador
Ecuadorian awards
Beauty pageants for youth
International beauty pageants